Hans Georg Emde (28 July 1919 – 15 February 2013) was a German politician of the Free Democratic Party (FDP) and former member of the German Bundestag.

Life 
Emde was a member of the German Bundestag from 1961 to 1969. From 19 February 1963 to 1965 he was a member of the executive committee of the FDP parliamentary group as Parliamentary Managing Director. From 1969 to 1972, Emde was a civil servant state secretary at the Federal Ministry of Finance and the Federal Ministry of Economics and Finance.

Literature

References

1919 births
2013 deaths
Members of the Bundestag for North Rhine-Westphalia
Members of the Bundestag 1965–1969
Members of the Bundestag 1961–1965
Members of the Bundestag for the Free Democratic Party (Germany)